Conway Christ Redneck Superstar: The greatest country'n'western story ever told is a satirical theatre production originally performed at La Boite Theatre's late night cabaret La Bamba on 13–16 November 1985. The production was directed by David Pyle and Sean Mee. The 1985 production featured 80 cast members and a 26-piece band. The season was booked out prior to opening night.

History 
Conway Christ Redneck Superstar was the second of six plays produced between 1985 and 1996 by a group of arts workers who formed a company called ToadShow Pty Ltd in 1986. All productions blended two well-known stories and interspersed the story with popular songs while satirising local politics and providing social comment.

ToadShow produced The Paisley Pirates of Penzance (1985), Conway Christ Redneck Superstar (1985) and Hound of Music (1986), SherWoodstock (1990), Phantoad of the Opera (1991) and Glamalot (1996). Theatre critic John Harris said, "The musicals are unique to Brisbane, conceived and written by a combination of talents undoubtedly unlike any to be found anywhere else in the world. They employ music with a rock beat, satire with a light touch, and casts of dozens, scores, or hundreds, depending upon the venue."

Story 
The story of Jesus Christ, Superstar is relocated to the south of North America where downtrodden rural workers are exploited by the evil Boss Roman. The workers seek assistance from retired gunslinger Joe Christ whose son Conway goes to the rescue. The satire includes elements of classic country and western music and films particularly The Magnificent Seven and High Noon.

Music 

 Heaven Is My Woman's Love
 Working For The Man
 Wand'rin' Star
 Walk Tall
 If I Were A Carpenter
 Convoy
 Jesus Christ, Superstar
 Stand By Your Man
 These Boots Were Made For Walkin'
 Gethsemane
 Are You Lonesome Tonight?
 (The Man Who Shot) Liberty Valance
 Ring Of Fire
 I Remember You
 Here You Come Again

Cast 

 Conway Christ - Pat Leo
 Boss Roman - Paul Sugars
 Mary Lou Magdalene - Justine Anderson
 Judith Iscariot - Toni Mott
 Qantas Pilot - Barry Searle
 Mary Christ - Lisa Hickey
 Joseph Christ - Adam Couper
 Mayor - Maria Cleary
 Sheriff - Andrew Blackman
 Roman I - Stephen O'Keefe
 Roman II - Scott Witt
 Roman III - Lil Kelman
 Juan - Simon Stocks
 Doo - Tony Biggs
 Trey - Annie Henderson
 Peter Bob - Roger Rosser
 Luke - Katrina Devery

Reception 
Sue Gough in The Australian said it was "the cleverest and most energetic show I have seen all year."

References 

Australian musicals